The Most Exalted Order of Paduka Keberanian Laila Terbilang, also translated as The Most Exalted Order of Famous Valour, is an order of Brunei. It was established on 1 August 1968 by Sultan Hassanal Bolkiah.

Rank 
The order consists of three classes:

Notable Recipients 
 Brunei Darussalam :
 Sultan Hassanal Bolkiah
 Crown Prince Al-Muhtadee Billah
 Prince Abdul Mateen
 Mariam 'Abdu'l Aziz
 Muhammad Irwan bin Haji Hambali
 Major General Aminan Mahmud
 Major General Sulaiman Damit
 Major General Aminuddin Ihsan
 Major General Haszaimi Bol Hassan

 Singapore :
 Lieutenant General Winston Choo, Chief of Defence Force of the Singapore Armed Forces
 Lieutenant General Ng Chee Meng, Chief of Defence Force of the Singapore Armed Forces
 Lieutenant General Neo Kian Hong, Chief of Defence Force of the Singapore Armed Forces
 Lieutenant General Ng Yat Chung, Chief of Defence Force of the Singapore Armed Forces
 Lieutenant General Desmond Kuek, Chief of Defence Force of the Singapore Armed Forces
 Lieutenant General Perry Lim, Chief of Defence Force of the Singapore Armed Forces
 Lieutenant General Melvyn Ong, Chief of Defence Force of the Singapore Armed Forces

 Thailand :
 General Songkitti Jaggabatara
 General Thanchaiyan Srisuwan 

 Indonesia:
 General L.B. Moerdani, Commander of the Indonesian National Armed Forces
 General Try Sutrisno, Commander of the Indonesian National Armed Forces
 General Feisal Tanjung, Commander of the Indonesian National Armed Forces
 General Wiranto, Commander of the Indonesian National Armed Forces
 Admiral Widodo Adi Sutjipto, Commander of the Indonesian National Armed Forces
 General Endriartono Sutarto, Commander of the Indonesian National Armed Forces
 Police-General Sutanto, Chief of the Indonesian National Police
 Air Chief Marshal Djoko Suyanto, Commander of the Indonesian National Armed Forces
 General Djoko Santoso, Commander of the Indonesian National Armed Forces
 Admiral Agus Suhartono, Commander of the Indonesian National Armed Forces
 General Moeldoko, Commander of the Indonesian National Armed Forces
 General Gatot Nurmantyo, Commander of the Indonesian National Armed Forces
 Police-General Tito Karnavian, Chief of the Indonesian National Police
 Air Chief Marshal Hadi Tjahjanto, Commander of the Indonesian National Armed Forces
 General Andika Perkasa, Commander of the Indonesian National Armed Forces

 Malaysia :
 General Mohd Zahidi bin Zainuddin, Chief of Defence Force of Malaysia
 Admiral Mohd Anwar Mohd Nor, Chief of Defence Force of Malaysia
 General Zulkifeli bin Mohd. Zin, Chief of Defence Force of Malaysia
 Inspector-General Police Khalid bin Abu Bakar, Inspector-General of Police of Malaysia
 General Raja Mohamed Affandi bin Raja Mohamed Noor, Chief of Defence Forces of Malaysia
 Genaral Zulkifli bin Zainal Abidin Chief of Defence Force of Malaysia
 General Affendi bin Buang, Chief of Defence Force of Malaysia

References 

Orders, decorations, and medals of Brunei
Awards established in 1968
1968 establishments in Brunei